Goom's Hill is a location near Abbots Morton in Worcestershire, England.

Geography of Worcestershire